Kalayat is a city and a municipal committee in Kaithal district in the Indian state of Haryana. It is historical town known as Kapilayat and Kapilayatana in past, named after the Vedic sage Kapil Muni, is home of the 8th century Kalayat Ancient Bricks Temple Complex. After Dwarka drowned , Warrior Pandav Arjun along with Ahir women and children went towards Hastinapur via Kaithal .

Demographics
 India census, Kalayat had a population of 16,747. Males constitute 53% of the population and females 47%. Kalayat has an average literacy rate of 70%, lower than the national average of 74.04%: male literacy is 70%, and female literacy is 65%. In Kalayat, 17% of the population is under 0–6 years of age.

See also

 Kalayat Ancient Bricks Temple Complex 
 Khajuraho temples 
 List of Monuments of National Importance in Haryana
 List of State Protected Monuments in Haryana
 List of Indus Valley Civilization sites in Haryana 
 List of National Parks & Wildlife Sanctuaries of Haryana, India
 Haryana Tourism

References

Cities and towns in Kaithal district
48 kos parikrama of Kurukshetra